A company is a legal entity representing an association of people.

Company may also refer to:

Organizations
 Company (military unit), military unit of 80–250 soldiers
 Opera company, an instituted company that performs operas
 Theatre company, of touring actors, singers and/or dancers

Arts, entertainment, and media

Literature
 Company (novel), a 2006 novel by Max Barry
 Company (novella), a 1979 novella by Samuel Beckett

Music

Groups
 Company (band)
 Company (free improvisation group), a jazz collective founded in 1968

Albums
 Company (Bluejuice album), (2011)
 Company (Andy Burrows album) (2012)
 Company (The Drink album) (2014)

Songs
 "Company" (Broadway song), a song from Sondheim and Furth's musical Company
 "Company" (Justin Bieber song) (2015)
 "Company" (Tinashe song) (2016)
"Company" (24kGoldn song) (2021)
 "Company", a song by Drake from If You're Reading This It's Too Late
 "Company", a song by Third Eye Blind from Out of the Vein
 Company, the subtitle of String Quartet No. 2 by Philip Glass

Periodicals
 Company (British magazine)
 Company (LGBT magazine), a magazine in Hungary

Other uses in arts, entertainment, and media
 Company (2002 film), a Hindi film by Ram Gopal Varma
 Company (musical), a 1970 musical by Stephen Sondheim and George Furth
Company (2011 film), a 2011 filmed version of the 1970 musical

See also 
La Compagnie, French airline
"Kompanie",  Bonez MC and RAF Camora's 2018 rap song, from the album Palmen aus Plastik 2
Kompany (disambiguation)
The Company (disambiguation)